The African Jazz Pioneers is a South African group that espouses the music of the 1950s, fusing big band jazz with township marabi sounds. Band leader and saxophonist Bra Ntemi Piliso, who wrote most of the Pioneers' songs, opened the field of composition to the band's younger musicians.

History 
The background of the African Jazz Pioneers stretches back to the 1950s when jazz was in fashion and big bands enjoyed prominence. The Band from the Republic of South Africa, founded in the 1980s, plays '50s and '60s South African jazz, attempting to recreate the fun of that era's live performances. It was in those days when Dorkay House (at the end of Eloff Street, Johannesburg) provided a haven for South Africa's music legends, including artists like Dollar Brand, Kippie Moeketsi, Miriam Makeba, Ntemi Piliso, Dudu Pukwana, Hugh Masekela, Wilson Silgee, Zacks Nkosi, and Jonas Gwangwa. But all that ended in the '60s when big bands went out of fashion. Things remained that way until June 1981, when several members of the band decided it was time to get many of those great musicians back into Dorkay House and back on stage. Led by saxophone player Ntemi Piliso, a seasoned marabi star, the group comprises both veteran marabi players and younger musicians who have picked up the style.

In the early 1950s, Bra Ntemi and his Alexandra All Star band were at the cutting edge of South Africa's music scene, blending American big band sound with traditional Majuba tempos and Marabi influences.

The African Jazz Pioneers enjoyed enormous success and had a huge following in those days. All this came to an end in the late '60s with the demolition of Sophiatown, when big bands went out of fashion.

However, in June 1981, Bra Ntemi decided it was high time to re-unite the band and get them back on stage. The African Jazz Pioneers were back on the road and their first performance was at a church in Alexandra. Despite the pass laws, discriminatory practices and censorship, African Jazz Pioneers survived apartheid and evolved their music.

International fame came soon after their first overseas tour as part of the Casa conference in Amsterdam in 1987. After the easing of the boycott in 1990, the African Jazz Pioneers were among the first to travel all over the world and perform at festivals in France, Japan, Switzerland, England, Spain, Germany, Sweden and the Netherlands. During these years they shared the stage with the likes of Youssou N'Dour, Quincy Jones, Gilberto Gil, Nina Simone and Chick Corea.

The driving force behind the Pioneers has always been Bra Ntemi. Musicians have come and gone, but he was always at the core of the band, ensuring the continuance of its unique township jazz sound. But even he found it difficult to categorise the Pioneers' music. It derives from Marabi and evolved to include the instrumental sound of the big swing bands of Duke Ellington, and Count Basie. Since the band's early days, Bra Ntemi has changed from one structure to another without giving up anything along the way.

Just over 50 years ago, the young Ntemi settled for the saxophone, after his cherished trombone was stolen. The saxophone soon became his trademark and he was one of the country's best and most enduring saxophonists, for which he was honoured by Minister Ben Ngubane in August 2000, during a ceremony at Morelete Park, Mamelodi. Bra Ntemi died on 18 December 2000.

The African Jazz Pioneers are honouring their promise to Bra Ntemi to keep the music going. The Ikageng Jazz Festival, established in 2001, has been named "The Night of the Pioneers" and AJP closes each edition as top of the bill. In the last two years, they performed for the Flemish Minister of Culture, the President of the European Parliament and President Thabo Mbeki.

Members 
The African Jazz Pioneers are: 
 Albert Kumalo – bandleader, guitar
 Brahms Hlabatau – tenor sax
 Sello Manyaka – alto sax
 Mpho Sithole – alto sax
 Levy Kgasi – trumpet (Died 07 August 2016)
 Makhosonke Mrubata – trumpet (Left band)
 Phillip Tau – bass (Died)
 Madoda Gxabeka – drums
 Xolani Maseti – keyboards (Left band)
 Khanya Ceza – vocals.

Discography 
 1991 – African Jazz Pioneers
 1992 – Live at the Montreux Jazz Festival
 1993 – Sip 'n Fly
 1996 – Shufflin' Joe
 1999 – Afrika Vukani
 2004 – 76–3rd Avenue
 2005 – Alextown with Ernest Ranglin

References

External links
 
 

South African musical groups
South African jazz ensembles